Gypsum is a city in Saline County, Kansas, United States.  As of the 2020 census, the population of the city was 400.

History

Early history

For many millennia, the Great Plains of North America was inhabited by nomadic Native Americans.  From the 16th century to 18th century, the Kingdom of France claimed ownership of large parts of North America.  In 1762, after the French and Indian War, France secretly ceded New France to Spain, per the Treaty of Fontainebleau.

19th century
In 1802, Spain returned most of the land to France.  In 1803, most of the land for modern day Kansas was acquired by the United States from France as part of the 828,000 square mile Louisiana Purchase for 2.83 cents per acre.

In 1854, the Kansas Territory was organized, then in 1861 Kansas became the 34th U.S. state.  In 1860, Saline County was established within the Kansas Territory, which included the land for modern day Gypsum.

The community was founded as a Templer community called Tempelfeld. Gypsum was named after Gypsum Creek.  The Gypsum post office has operated under that name since 1886.

Geography
Gypsum is located at  (38.705118, -97.426876).

Demographics

It is part of the Salina Micropolitan Statistical Area.

2010 census
As of the census of 2010, there were 405 people, 162 households, and 111 families residing in the city. The racial makeup of the city was 94.6% White, 0.5% African American, 1.2% Native American, 1.0% Asian, 1.0% from other races, and 1.7% from two or more races. Hispanic or Latino of any race were 2.5% of the population.

There were 162 households, of which 29.0% had children under the age of 18 living with them, 50.6% were married couples living together, 11.7% had a female householder with no husband present, 6.2% had a male householder with no wife present, and 31.5% were non-families. 27.2% of all households were made up of individuals, and 8.1% had someone living alone who was 65 years of age or older. The average household size was 2.50 and the average family size was 2.97.

The median age in the city was 39.9 years. 26.7% of residents were under the age of 18; 6.6% were between the ages of 18 and 24; 24.5% were from 25 to 44; 27.7% were from 45 to 64; and 14.6% were 65 years of age or older. The gender makeup of the city was 47.2% male and 52.8% female.

2000 census
As of the census of 2000, there were 414 people, 158 households, and 111 families residing in the city. The racial makeup of the city was 95.17% White, 1.21% African American, 0.24% from other races, and 3.38% from two or more races. Hispanic or Latino of any race were 0.97% of the population.

There were 158 households, out of which 36.7% had children under the age of 18 living with them, 57.6% were married couples living together, 7.6% had a female householder with no husband present, and 29.7% were non-families. 25.3% of all households were made up of individuals, and 12.0% had someone living alone who was 65 years of age or older. The average household size was 2.62 and the average family size was 3.09.

In the city, the population was spread out, with 28.5% under the age of 18, 7.2% from 18 to 24, 29.7% from 25 to 44, 23.4% from 45 to 64, and 11.1% who were 65 years of age or older. The median age was 36 years. For every 100 females, there were 102.9 males. For every 100 females age 18 and over, there were 107.0 males.

The median income for a household in the city was $30,833, and the median income for a family was $34,375. Males had a median income of $27,000 versus $17,386 for females. The per capita income for the city was $16,440. About 4.1% of families and 6.0% of the population were below the poverty line, including 3.5% of those under age 18 and 9.4% of those age 65 or over.

Government
The Gypsum government consists of a mayor and five council members.  The council meets the 2nd Monday of each month at 7 pm.

Education
The community is served by Southeast of Saline USD 306 public school district.  The Southeast of Saline High School mascot is the Trojans.

Gypsum schools were closed through school unification. The Gypsum High School mascot was Pirates.

Notable people
 Steve Fritz (b1967), 4th place in 1996 Olympic decathlon, assistant coach for the Kansas State University track and field team for 21 years.
 Bill Wheatley (1909-1992), basketball player who competed in the 1936 Summer Olympics with the American basketball team that won a gold medal.
 Frank Wilkeson (1848-1913), New York Times journalist and Washington explorer who owned a large ranch in Gypsum for nearly forty years.
 JD Andrew (b1973) sound engineer and musician; member of The Boxmasters with Billy Bob Thornton.

See also
 National Register of Historic Places listings in Saline County, Kansas

References

Further reading

External links

 
 Gypsum - Directory of Public Officials
 Gypsum city map, KDOT

Year of establishment missing
Cities in Kansas
Cities in Saline County, Kansas
Salina, Kansas micropolitan area
1886 establishments in Kansas
Populated places established in 1886